The Great Filter is the title of Chicago band Tub Ring's 2007 release, and their debut on The End Records. The CD was released on May 1, 2007, with advance copies available at the release party (along with a unique Tub Ring/3-2-1 Activate! split CD, called Alter Egos) on April 27, 2007. The album keeps up the tradition of the past 3 Tub Ring albums in that it contains a SETI reference in the title (see The Great Filter), and contains a "Robot" track.

Track listing

"Friends and Enemies" – 3:27
"The Charismatic Smile" – 2:59
"Seven Exodus" – 2:52
"Get Help (Now!)" – 2:35
"When the Crash Happened" – 2:32
"Killers in Love" – 4:13
"No One Wants to Play" – 4:23
"Requiem for a Robot" – 0:38
"Life in Transition" – 3:25
"Glass Companion" – 3:20
"Making No Sound (At All)" – 3:14
"The Truth" – 2:10
"Wrong Kind of Message" – 4:19
"My Job Here is Done" – 3:16

Non-album tracks
"Dynamite" – 3:15 3-2-1 Activate! cover (iTunes exclusive track)
"This is the Sound" – 2:32 (included on Alter Egos)
"Touch" – 3:06 (included on Alter Egos)
"Rock Your Body" – 2:51 Justin Timberlake cover (as yet unreleased, was available on their MySpace page for one day preceding the album's release)
"The Uninitiated" – 2:01 Rob Kleiner cover (available via a URL given in the album's liner notes)
"Heathens" – 2:44 (available via a URL given in the album's liner notes)

Personnel
Kevin Gibson – Vocals
Rob Kleiner – Keyboards, Producer
Trevor Erb – Bass guitar
Chris Wiken – Drums
Jeff Enokian – Guitar
Dave Smith – Saxophone
Dave Winer – Trumpet
David Keller – Cello
Charles Crepeau – Violin
Roxanne Hegyesy – Vocals
Sara Sleeper – Vocals
Neal Ostrovsky – Producer, Engineer, Additional Samples
Tanner Woodford – Art Direction, Design

External links
The Great Shift – The "path" given in the liner notes, containing two B-sides in .mp3 format. (Link dead)

Tub Ring albums
2007 albums
The End Records albums